The 1st Australian Logistic Support Group (1 ALSG) was a ground support unit of the Australian Army during the Vietnam War located at the 1st Australian Support Compound in Vũng Tàu. 1 ALSG commanded logistic support units to all Australian forces in South Vietnam and was composed of engineer, transport, ordnance, medical and service corps units. The unit was initially formed in 1965 as the Australian Logistic Support Company to support the 1st Battalion, Royal Australian Regiment, and was redesignated as 1 ALSG in April 1966 following the deployment of the 1st Australian Task Force as the Australian commitment in Vietnam expanded.

Organisation
 Headquarters 1 ALSG
 17 Construction Squadron
 1,3 and 32 Small Ships Troops
 87 Transport Platoon
 21 Supply Platoon
 Detachment 176 Air Dispatch Company
 2 Field Ambulance (later replaced by 8 Field Ambulance)
 101 Field Workshop
 Detachment 1st Division Postal Unit
 1st Australian Rest and Convalescence Centre
 104 Signal Squadron

Notes

References

Ad hoc units and formations of Australia
Military units and formations of Australia in the Vietnam War
Military logistics units and formations of the Australian Army